Lauritz Stub Wiberg (11 March 1875 – 24 June 1929) was a Norwegian actor.  He made his stage debut at the Bergen theatre Den Nationale Scene in 1898, and played at Nationaltheatret in Kristiania from 1903.

He participated in the film Glomdalsbruden from 1926.

He was decorated as Knight, First Class of the Royal Norwegian Order of St. Olav in 1928, and was Knight of the Swedish Order of the Polar Star.

References

1875 births
1929 deaths
Norwegian male stage actors
Norwegian male film actors
Norwegian male silent film actors
20th-century Norwegian male actors
Knights of the Order of the Polar Star
Actors from Bergen